Presidente Castro Pinto International Airport  is the airport serving João Pessoa, Brazil located in the adjoining municipality of Santa Rita. The airport is named after João Pereira de Castro Pinto (1863-1944), a lawyer, writer and former Governor of the State of Paraíba.

It is operated by AENA.

History
The airport was officially opened on August 20, 1957. Between February 1, 1979 and March 14, 2019 it was administrated by Infraero.

Between 1980 and 1981 Infraero conducted major renovations and enlargements of the runway, taxiways and apron and in 1983 a cargo terminal was opened. In 1985 the new passenger terminal was opened and in 1995 it underwent renovations and enlargements.

Previously operated by Infraero, on March 15, 2019 AENA won a 30-year concession to operate the airport.

Airlines and destinations

Notes
 Gol Transportes Aéreos's flights operate from João Pessoa to Buenos Aires via Natal. However, the airline does not have cabotage rights to transport passengers solely between João Pessoa and Natal.

Access

See also

List of airports in Brazil

References

External links

Airports in Paraíba
Airports established in 1957
Buildings and structures in João Pessoa, Paraíba